The Audi S1 is Audi's smallest S model car and a performance version of the Audi A1. The first variant (Typ 8X, produced from 2014 to 2018) has 228 hp (231 PS / 170 kW) derived from the Volkswagen group's EA888 2.0 litre turbo four cylinder, and on demand Haldex Quattro four-wheel-drive.

Performance
The 3-door S1 accelerates from 0-62 mph (0-100 km/h) in 5.8 seconds whereas the 5-door 'Sportback' variant takes 0.1 second longer at 5.9 seconds. Both models have an electronically limited top speed of 155 mph (250 km/h).

See also
Audi A1

References

S1
Hatchbacks
2010s cars
Cars introduced in 2014
All-wheel-drive vehicles